Statistics of Czechoslovak First League in the 1927–28 season. Karel Meduna was the league's top scorer with 12 goals.

Overview
It was contested by 7 teams, and FK Viktoria Žižkov won the championship.

League standings

Results

Top goalscorers

References

Czechoslovakia - List of final tables (RSSSF)

Czechoslovak First League seasons
1927–28 in Czechoslovak football
Czech